Henry Verner Hampton (1888 – 3 August 1946) was an Irish international footballer who played professionally in Scotland and England as a half back.

Career
Born in Dublin, Hampton moved from Scottish club Dundee (where he had only played in the reserves) to English club Bradford City in March 1910. He returned to Ireland in May 1914 to play with Distillery.

Hampton also represented Ireland at international level, earning 9 caps between 1911 and 1914.

References

External links
NIFG
Bantamspast

1888 births
1946 deaths
Irish association footballers (before 1923)
Pre-1950 IFA international footballers
Dundee F.C. players
Bradford City A.F.C. players
Lisburn Distillery F.C. players
Scottish Football League players
English Football League players
Association football midfielders
Association footballers from Dublin (city)
NIFL Premiership players